A Madea Christmas is a 2011 American stage play created, produced, written, and directed by Tyler Perry. It stars Tyler Perry as Mabel "Madea" Simmons and Cassi Davis as Aunt Bam. The play also marks the debut appearance of Hattie Mae Love, played by Patrice Lovely. The live performance released on DVD (November 22, 2011) was recorded live in Atlanta at the Cobb Energy Performing Arts Centre on May 13 - 14, 2011.

Plot
The members of the Mansell family—who can be identified without fear of stereotyping as mean mother Lillian, pompous father John, restless daughter China, and virginal son Japan —prepare for the holiday feast with the help of their saintly maid Margaret and their mouthy chef Hattie. Eager to impress China's super-rich beau/presumed fiancé Bobby, Lilian forces Margaret to work on Christmas instead of celebrating with her family. So China secretly invites the whole disreputable brood: Madea, Aunt Bam, and grown children Lucy, George, and Eric. China was once in love with Eric; his reappearance lets her rethink her relationship with Bobby.

Cast
 Tyler Perry as Madea
 Cassi Davis as Aunt Bam 
 Chandra Currelley-Young as Lillian
 Cheryl Pepsii Riley as Margaret
 Támar Davis as China
 Tony Grant as Eric
 Patrice Lovely as Hattie

 Maurice Lauchner as John

 Zuri Craig as Japan
 Jeffery Lewis as George
 Alexis Jones as Lucy

 Shannon Williams as Bobby

The Band 

 Ronnie Garrett - Musical Director & Bass Guitar
 Derek Scott - Guitar
 Marcus Williams - Drums
 Michael Burton - Saxophone
 Justin Gilbert - Keyboards
 Aaron Draper - Percussion
 Jeff Bradshaw - Trombone
 Natalie Ragins - Keyboards & Organ
 Melvin Jones - Trumpet
 Sheryl Boyd - Background Vocals & Lucy (Understudy)
 Natasha Evans - Background Vocals
 Tony Hightower - Background Vocals

Musical Numbers
All songs written and/or produced by Tyler Perry and Elvin D. Ross.
 "O Come, All Ye Faithful" - Margaret, Lillian, Hattie, Japan and John

 "What About Us?" - Japan and China

 "That's My Little Girl..." - John

 "I Pray" - Margaret
 "Who's It Gonna Be?" - Eric 
 Gospel Medley
 "Jesus Never Fails" - Margaret and Hattie
 "Tis' So Sweet to Trust in Jesus" - Aunt Bam
 "What a Friend We Have in Jesus" - Lillian

 "Lord I Need You More Than Ever Before" - Lillian

 "Please Be The Man" - China 

 "O Holy Night" - Eric

 "Mary Did You Know?" - Lucy and John

 "Do You Hear What I Hear?" -  China and George

Film adaptation
The film Tyler Perry's A Madea Christmas was released in theaters on December 13, 2013. However, the film version is only connected to the stageplay via name-only. Otherwise, it has a completely different storyline and different characters.

External links
 
 Tyler Perry Official website
 AJC Article
 A Madea Christmas Homepage

2011 plays
African-American plays
American plays adapted into films
Plays by Tyler Perry